Victrex plc is a British-based supplier of high performance polymers. It is a constituent of the FTSE 250. The company's headquarters and manufacturing facilities are based in the UK with technical and customer support facilities in multiple markets, serving more than 40 countries. Victrex serves a diverse range of industries including aerospace, automotive, electronics, oil and gas and medical.

History

The company was established in 1993 by way of a management buyout of the PEEK polymer business of Imperial Chemical Industries plc. It was first listed on the London Stock Exchange in 1995. Based in Cleveleys near Blackpool in Lancashire Victrex has historically invested heavily to increase its capacity, most recently investing £90 million to increase production capacity by around 70%. By 2015 the production capacity of its polymer will be over 7,000 MT per annum (current capacity of 4,250 MT per annum).

Operations
The company is a manufacturer of high-performance polyaryletherketones, including VICTREX PEEK polymer, VICTREX pipes and PEEK-OPTIMA. Its business is organized as two business units:
Victrex Polymer Solutions (VPS) - that focuses on transport, industrial, oil and gas and the electronics markets
Invibio Biomaterial Solutions (Invibio) - that focuses on implantable PEEK bio-material solutions

References

External links
  Official site

Chemical companies established in 1993
Companies based in Lancashire
Manufacturing companies of the United Kingdom
Companies listed on the London Stock Exchange
1993 establishments in the United Kingdom
Companies established in 1993
Manufacturing companies established in 1993
Oil and gas companies